Mount Nanlaud is the highest point of the Federated States of Micronesia and of the Micronesian island of Pohnpei at   as indicated on the definitive USGS 1:25,000 scale topographic survey.  
It is located in the southern part of the island on the border between the northeastern corner of Kitti Municipality and the southern tip of Nett Municipality.

Some sources  misread the nearby "772" point elevation from the USGS survey; on that map, the peak labeled "Nanlaud" has a 780-meter contour, as does the second-highest peak, 1.4 km to the southeast of Nanlaud, labeled "Ngihneni".  Dolohmwar (Totolom), the third highest peak at 760 meters, is an additional 0.8 km along the ridge from “Ngihneni”.

References

Mountains of the Federated States of Micronesia